This is a list of the squads picked for the 2007 Cricket World Cup. This was the ninth Cricket World Cup tournament and was held between 14 March and 28 April 2007. The sixteen teams asked to announce their final squads by 13 February 2007. Changes were allowed after this deadline at the discretion of the ICCs Technical Committee in necessary cases, such as due to player injury. In order to aid the teams to select the final 15, teams were given the option to announce a 30-man squad by mid-January, with the understanding that the final squad would be picked from these 30 players. However, this was not strictly adhered to – several of England's final 15 came from outside the initial 30, for example. The oldest player at the 2007 Cricket World Cup was Desmond Chumney (39) of Canada while the youngest was Alexei Kervezee of the Netherlands.

Group A

Australia 

Australia named their 15-man squad on 13 February 2007. On 23 February 2007, Brett Lee was removed from the squad due to injury and was replaced by Stuart Clark.

Coach: John Buchanan

Netherlands 
The KNCB named their 15-man squad on 13 February 2007. The squad was unchanged from that which was named for the World Cricket League Division One event in January 2007.

Coach: Peter Cantrell

Scotland 

Scotland named their squad in August 2006, to assist the players in arranging work and training schedules. However, Glenn Rogers later came in for Omer Hussain. Of the Scotland 15, Gavin Hamilton and John Blain have previous World Cup experience.

Coach: Peter Drinnen

South Africa 

South Africa named their 15-man squad on 15 February.

Coach: Mickey Arthur

Group B

Bangladesh 

Bangladesh named their 15-man squad on 13 February.
Farhad Reza brought in for Tapash Baisya, 7 April.

Coach: Dav Whatmore

Bermuda 

Bermuda announced their 15-man squad on 13 February 2007.

Coach: Gus Logie

India 

India announced their final 15-man squad on 12 February 2007.

Coach: Greg Chappell

Sri Lanka 

Sri Lanka announced their 15-man squad on 12 February 2007.

Coach: Tom Moody

Group C

Canada 

Canada named their 15-man squad on 14 February 2007.

Coach: Andy Pick

England 

England announced their final 15-man squad at The Oval on 14 February 2007. Jon Lewis was replaced by Stuart Broad on 4 April 2007 to allow him to return home to his wife as she was experiencing complications in the latter stages of her pregnancy).

Coach: Duncan Fletcher

Kenya 

Kenya named their 15-man squad on 13 February 2007.

Coach: Roger Harper

New Zealand 

New Zealand announced a preliminary squad on 14 January 2007, BLACKCAPS squad named for World Cup, and announced their 15-man squad on 13 February 2007.

Daryl Tuffey was injured during the tournament; he was replaced by Chris Martin on 25 March.

Lou Vincent was injured during the tournament; he was replaced by Hamish Marshall on 26 March.

Coach: John Bracewell

Group D

Ireland 

Ireland named their squad in August 2006, the first country to do so, in order to assist the players in arranging work and training schedules. Irish player Ed Joyce, who turned out for Ireland in qualifying matches, was in England's squad.

Coach: Adrian Birrell

Pakistan 

Pakistan announced a preliminary squad on 10 January 2007, and the final 15-man squad on 13 February 2007. Both Shoaib Akhtar and Mohammad Asif were included, despite their ongoing doping case, where the Pakistan Cricket Board had first banned them before a tribunal reprieved the two. In a twist of fate, both players were replaced by Mohammad Sami and Yasir Arafat on 1 March due to knee and elbow injuries respectively.

Pakistan had already made one change due to injury: Azhar Mahmood joined the squad in place of Abdul Razzaq, who suffered a knee injury during a practice session on 26 February.

Coach: Bob Woolmer (died during tournament) and Mushtaq Ahmed (acting coach)

West Indies 

West Indies named their squad on 15 February 2007.

Coach: Bennett King

Zimbabwe 

Zimbabwe's 15-man squad was announced on 14 February; only one player remains from the 2003 squad.

Coach: Kevin Curran

References 

Cricket World Cup squads
squads